Kushk-e Sar Tang (also Romanized as Kūshk-e Sar Tang and Kūshk-i-Sartang; also known as Amīr Sālār-e Sar Tang and Kūshk) is a village in Pol Beh Bala Rural District, Simakan District, Jahrom County, Fars Province, Iran. At the 2006 census, its population was 813, in 169 families.

References 

Populated places in Jahrom County